Achyranthes is a genus of medicinal and ornamental plants in the amaranth family, Amaranthaceae. Chaff flower is a common name for plants in this genus.

Species include:
 Achyranthes ancistrophora C.C.Towns.
 Achyranthes arborescens R.Br.
 Achyranthes aspera L. (= A. argentea) (Sanskrit : apamarg (अपामार्ग))
 Achyranthes atollensis (extinct)
 Achyranthes bidentata Blume
 Achyranthes coynei Santapau
 Achyranthes diandra Roxb.
 Achyranthes fasciculata (Suess.) C.C.Towns.
 Achyranthes faureri
 Achyranthes mangarevica Suess.
 Achyranthes marchionica R.Br.
 Achyranthes margaretarum de Lange
 Achyranthes mutica A.Gray ex H.Mann
 Achyranthes shahii M.R.Almeida & S.M.Almeida
 Achyranthes splendens Mart. ex Moq.
 Achyranthes talbotii Hutch. & Dalziel

References

External links
Flora of North America: Achyranthes

 
Amaranthaceae genera